The 2011 MTV Video Music Aid Japan were held in Chiba on June 25, 2011 at the Makuhari Messe. The VMAJ were the culmination of MTV Japan's Music of Hope campaign, the channel's multiplatform response to the 2011 Tōhoku earthquake and tsunami. The 2011 awards were marked the ten-year anniversary of the MTV Video Music Awards Japan.

On May 1, a pre-event to promote the awards was held, starting at 4 pm (JST) at the Yoyogi National Gymnasium. Performers included the singer Nishino Kana and the boy band MBLAQ. Additionally, MTV Japan donated 10 Yens per vote to the Japanese Red Cross.

Lady Gaga opened the show trapped in a giant spider web for her performance of "The Edge of Glory", the latest single from her third album Born This Way. Later, Gaga climbed to the top of the stage to a custom-made spider-shaped piano inspired by Maman, the ten-metre Louise Bourgeois sculpture located in Roppongi Hills in Tokyo, and performed "Born This Way".

The winners were announced on July 2, on a special program. The big winner was Lady Gaga with three awards, including Video of the Year, Best Female Video and Best Dance Video.

Awards

Video of the Year
Lady Gaga — "Born This Way"
Namie Amuro — "Break It"
Katy Perry featuring Snoop Dogg — "California Gurls"
Girls' Generation — "Tell Me Your Wish (Genie)"
Hikaru Utada — "Goodbye Happiness"

Album of the Year
Kana Nishino — To Love
Eminem — Recovery
Miliyah Kato — Heaven
Linkin Park — A Thousand Suns
Yui — Holidays in the Sun

Best Male Video
Bruno Mars — "Just the Way You Are"
B.o.B. (feat. Hayley Williams) – Airplanes
Kanye West featuring Pusha T — "Runaway"
Saito Kazuyoshi — "Zutto Suki Datta"
Shota Shimizu — "You & I"

Best Female Video
Lady Gaga — "Born This Way"
Miliyah Kato — "X.O.X.O."
Rihanna — "Only Girl (In the World)"
Taylor Swift — "Mine"
Yui — "Rain"

Best Group Video
Girls' Generation — "Tell Me Your Wish (Genie)"
The Black Eyed Peas — "The Time (Dirty Bit)"
Ikimono-gakari — "Arigatō"
Linkin Park — "The Catalyst"
W-inds — "Let's Get It On"

Best New Artist
Justin Bieber featuring Ludacris — "Baby"
B.o.B featuring Bruno Mars — "Nothin' on You"
Naoto Inti Raymi — "Takaramono (Kono Koe ga Naku Naru Made)"
Sandaime J Soul Brothers — "On Your Mark (Hikari no Kiseki)"
Shinsei Kamattechan — "Michinaru Hou e"

Best Rock Video
Tokio Hotel — "Dark Side of the Sun"
Linkin Park — "The Catalyst"
One Ok Rock — "Jibun Rock"
Radwimps — "Dada"
Vampire Weekend — "Cousins

Best Pop Video
Ikimono-gakari — "Arigatō"
Juju — "Kono Yoru o Tomete yo"
Katy Perry featuring Snoop Dogg — "California Gurls"
Kana Nishino — "Kimi tte"
Taylor Swift — "Mine"

Best R&B Video
Rihanna — "Only Girl (In the World)"
Ai — "Nemurenai Machi"
Miliyah Kato — "X.O.X.O."
Ne-Yo — "Champagne Life"
Usher featuring will.i.am — "OMG"

Best Hip-Hop Video
Eminem — "Not Afraid"
AK-69 — "Public Enemy"
Far East Movement featuring Cataracs and Dev — "Like a G6"
Kanye West — "Power"
Seeda — "This Is How We Do It"

Best Reggae Video
Iyaz — "Replay"
Fire Ball — "Dreamer"
Han-Kun — "Touch The Sky"
Nas and Damian Marley — "As We Enter"
Ryo the Skywalker — "Taiyou Ni Naritai Yo"

Best Dance Video
Lady Gaga — "Born This Way"
Dorian — "Morning Calling"
Mark Ronson & The Business Intl. featuring Q-Tip and MNDR — "Bang Bang Bang"
The Backwoods — "Flying Bugz"
Underworld — "Always Loved a Film"

Best Video from a film
Avril Lavigne — "Alice" (from Alice in Wonderland)
Asian Kung–Fu Generation — "Solanin" (from Solanin)
Daft Punk — "Derezzed" (from Tron: Legacy)
Flumpool — "Kimi ni Todoke" (from Kimi ni Todoke)
Justin Bieber featuring Jaden Smith — "Never Say Never" (from The Karate Kid)

Best Collaboration
Eminem featuring Rihanna — "Love the Way You Lie"
Ai featuring Namie Amuro – "Fake"
Brahman + Ego-Wrappin' – "We Are Here"
Katy Perry featuring Snoop Dogg — "California Gurls"
Nicki Minaj featuring will.i.am — "Check It Out"

Best Karaokee! Song
Girls' Generation — "Tell Me Your Wish (Genie)"
Avril Lavigne — "Alice"
Ikimono-gakari — "Arigatō"
Justin Bieber featuring Ludacris — "Baby"
Kana Nishino — "Kimi tte"

Live performances
Lady Gaga — "The Edge of Glory" / "Born This Way"
AKB48 — "Beginner" / "Everyday, Kachūsha" / "Heavy Rotation"
Girls' Generation — "The Great Escape" / "Mr. Taxi"
Shinee — "Replay (Kimi wa Boku no Everything)"
Monkey Majik— "Mahou no Kotoba"
Namie Amuro featuring Ai and Anna Tsuchiya — "Wonder Women"
Kana Nishino — "Esperanza" / "Kimi tte"
Tokio Hotel — "Dark Side of the Sun" / "Monsoon"
Exile — "Victory" / "I Wish For You"

Guest celebrities
Ai
AKB48
Thelma Aoyama
Beni
Yuya Matsushita
MiChi
Naoto Inti Raymi
The Shibuhara Girls
Anna Tsuchiya
Verbal
W-inds

References

External links
MTV Video Music Awards Japan website

2011 in Japanese music